Izhboldino (İşbuldı) is a rural locality (a selo) and the administrative centre of Izhboldinsky Selsoviet, Yanaulsky District, Bashkortostan, Russia. The population was 348 as of 2010. There are 4 streets.

Geography 
Izhboldino is located 30 km south of Yanaul (the district's administrative centre) by road. Isanbayevo is the nearest rural locality.

References 

Rural localities in Yanaulsky District